Comin' Thru is the seventh album by American psychedelic rock band Quicksilver Messenger Service. It is generally regarded as their weakest effort, and more or less marked the end of Quicksilver as anything other than a part-time band.

Track listing
Side one
"Doin' Time in the U.S.A." (Gary Duncan) – 4:15
"Chicken" (Traditional, arranged by Dino Valenti) – 4:03
"Changes" (Valenti) – 4:15
"California State Correctional Facility Blues" (Valenti, Duncan, Greg Elmore, Chuck Steaks) – 6:10
Side two
"Forty Days" (Valenti, Duncan, Elmore) – 5:31
"Mojo" (Valenti) – 5:34
"Don't Lose It" (Duncan, Valenti) – 5:57

Personnel
 Dino Valenti – vocals, guitar, congas
 Gary Duncan – guitar, vocals
 Chuck Steaks – organ
 Mark Ryan – bass
 Greg Elmore – drums

Additional personnel
 Ken Balzell – trumpet (track B1)
 Dalton Smith – trumpet (tracks A3, B2, B3)
 Bud Brisbois – trumpet (tracks A3, B2, B3)
 Pat O'Hara – trombone (track B1)
 Charles C. Loper – trombone (tracks A3, B2, B3)
 Sonny Lewis – saxophone (track B1)
 Donald Menza – saxophone (tracks A3, B2, B3)

Charts
 Album

Billboard (United States)

References

Quicksilver Messenger Service albums
1972 albums
Capitol Records albums